Flindersia bennettii, commonly known as Bennett's ash, is a species of tree in the family Rutaceae and is endemic to north-eastern Australia. It has pinnate leaves with between three and nine leaflets, cream-coloured flowers arranged on the ends of branchlets and woody fruit containing winged seeds.

Description

Taxonomy
Flindersia bennettii was first formally described in 1861 by Charles Moore from an unpublished description by Ferdinand von Mueller, and the description was published in Catalogue of the Natural and Industrial Products of New South Wales, exhibited in the School of Arts by the International Exhibition Commissioners.

Distribution and habitat

Conservation status
Flindersia bennettii is classified as of "least concern" under the Queensland Government Nature Conservation Act 1992.

Uses
The timber of Bennett's ash is straight grained and easily worked. It was previously used for timber in the construction of coaches, boat building, cabinet and joinery work. It is an excellent carving wood. The weight is between 800 and 850 kilograms per cubic metre.

References

bennettii
Sapindales of Australia
Flora of New South Wales
Flora of Queensland
Trees of Australia
Taxa named by Charles Moore
Plants described in 1861